This is a list of defunct airlines of Norway.

See also

 List of airlines of Norway
 List of airports in Norway

References

Norway
Airlines
Airlines, defunct